Jamie Talbot (born 30 September 1988) is a Danish singer who was runner-up on the eleventh season of the Danish version of the X Factor behind the winners Place on Earth. He competed in Dansk Melodi Grand Prix 2020 with the song "Bye Bye Heaven" but he did not advance to the final 3.

Performances during X Factor

Discography

Singles
 "Goldmine" (2018)
 "Before We Drown" (2019)
 "Nightmare" (2019)
 "Bye Bye Heaven" (2020)
 "Try Again" (2021)
 "Tear Me a Moon" (2021)
 "Lila" (2021)
 "Has It" (2021)

Studio Albums
 "Has It" (2021)

EPs

References

External links

Danish male singers
Living people
1988 births
People from Aalborg